Keith John Kingston Roberts (20 September 1935 – 5 October 2000) was an English science fiction author. He began publishing with two stories in the September 1964 issue of Science Fantasy magazine, "Anita" (the first of a series of stories featuring a teenage modern witch and her eccentric granny) and "Escapism".

Several of his early stories were written using the pseudonym Alistair Bevan. His second novel, Pavane, which is a collection of linked stories, may be his most famous work: an alternate history novel in which the Catholic Church takes control of England following the assassination of Queen Elizabeth I.

Roberts wrote numerous novels and short stories and worked as an illustrator. His artistic contributions include covers and interior artwork for New Worlds and Science Fantasy, later renamed Impulse. He also edited the last few issues of Impulse although the nominal editor was Harry Harrison.

Roberts' first novel, The Furies, makes an appearance in the American TV series Bones in the third season's third episode "Death in the Saddle" (9 October 2007).

Roberts described himself as a political conservative and 
an anti-communist.

In later life, Roberts lived in Salisbury. He was diagnosed with multiple sclerosis in 1990, and died of its complications in October 2000. Obituaries recalled him as a talented but personally "difficult" author, with a history of disputes with publishers, editors and colleagues.

Partial bibliography

Novels
The Furies (1966) – a traditional UK disaster tale. Adapted into a six-part thriller on BBC Radio 4 in May 1970.
Pavane (1968) – a collection of linked short stories
Anita (1970) – a collection of linked short stories
The Inner Wheel (1970) – a collection of linked short stories
The Boat of Fate (1971) – a historical novel set in Britain at the end of the Roman Empire's power
The Chalk Giants (1974) – a collection of linked short stories
Molly Zero (1980) – a novel set in a dystopian future
Kiteworld (1985) – originally published as linked short stories
Kaeti & Company (1986) – linked short fiction
Gráinne (1987) – slipstream fiction
The Road to Paradise (1989) – a thriller, without fantastic elements
Kaeti on Tour (1992) – linked short fiction
Drek Yarman (2000) - a novel set in Kiteworld, serialized in Spectrum SF

Collections
Machines and Men (1973)
 "Escapism" (1964)
 "Therapy 2000" (1969) 
 "Manscarer" (1966) 
 "Boulter's Canaries" (1965) 
 "Sub-Lim" (1965) 
 "Synth" (1966) 
 "The Deeps" (1966) 
 "Breakdown" (1966)
 "The Pace That Kills" (1966)
 "Manipulation" (1965)
The Grain Kings (1976)
 "Weihnachtsabend" (1972)
 "The White Boat" (1966)
 "The Passing of the Dragons" (1972)  
 "The Trustie Tree" (1973)  
 "The Lake of Tuonela" (1973)  
 "The Grain Kings" (1972)  
 "I Lose Medea" (1972)
The Passing of the Dragons (1977) - selected stories from Machines and Men and The Grain Kings
Ladies from Hell (1979)
 "Our Lady of Desperation" (1979) 
 "The Shack at Great Cross Halt" (1977)  
 "The Ministry of Children" (1975)  
 "The Big Fans" (1977)  
 "Missa Privata" (1976)
The Lordly Ones (1986)
 "The Lordly Ones" (1980) 
 "Ariadne Potts" (1978)  
 "Sphairistike" (1984)  
 "The Checkout" (1981)  
 "The Comfort Station" (1980)  
 "The Castle on the Hoop" (1986)
 "Diva" (1986)
A Heron Caught in Weeds (1987) – poetry collection, edited by Jim Goddard
Winterwood and Other Hauntings (1989) – ghost story collection, with an introduction by Robert Holdstock
 "Susan" (1965) 
 "The Scarlet Lady" (1966) 
 "The Eastern Windows" (1967) 
 "Winterwood" (1974)
 "Mrs. Cibber" (1989)
 "The Snake Princess" (1973) 
 "Everything in the Garden" (1973)

Other
The Natural History of the P.H. (1988) – short essay about the "Primitive Heroine"
Irish Encounters: A Short Travel (1989) – essays about a trip to Ireland in 1978
Lemady: Episodes of a Writer's Life (1997) – autobiography, with fictional elements

Awards and nominations

Awards 
 British Science Fiction Association Award 1982 – Short fiction: "Kitemaster" (Interzone, Spring 1982)
 British Science Fiction Association Award 1986 – Short fiction: "Kaeti and the Hangman" (Kaeti & Company)
 British Science Fiction Association Award 1986 – Artist: Keith Roberts
 British Science Fiction Association Award 1987 – Novel: Gráinne

Nominations 
 Nebula Award 1971 – Best Novella: "The God House" (New Worlds Quarterly No. 1, 1971)
 British Science Fiction Association Award 1980 – Novel: Molly Zero
 Hugo Award 1981 – Best Novelette: "The Lordly Ones" (Fantasy & Science Fiction, March 1980)
 British Science Fiction Association Award 1985 – Novel: Kiteworld
 John W. Campbell Memorial Award 1986 (Joint 3rd place): Kiteworld
 Nebula Award 1987 – Best Novella: "The Tiger Sweater" (Fantasy & Science Fiction, October 1987)
 Arthur C. Clarke Award 1988: Gráinne

References

External links

The Worlds of Keith Roberts by Jim Goddard, Solaris Books (updated 9 October 2000)

 

1935 births
2000 deaths
English science fiction writers
English fantasy writers
English illustrators
English graphic designers
Deaths from multiple sclerosis
Neurological disease deaths in England
People from Kettering
20th-century English novelists
BSFA Award for Best Artwork winner
20th-century British short story writers
English male novelists
20th-century English male writers